Bai Tianci (born 28 August 1998) is a Chinese footballer currently playing as a forward for Hefei City.

Career statistics

Club
.

References

1998 births
Living people
People from Huainan
Footballers from Anhui
Chinese footballers
Association football forwards
China League Two players
China League One players
Shandong Taishan F.C. players
Shanghai Shenxin F.C. players
Guangdong South China Tiger F.C. players
Kunshan F.C. players
21st-century Chinese people